Eagle Ridge Christian School is a private Christian school and Conservative/Republican school located in Cape Girardeau, Missouri on route K.   This school has programs from preschool through high school. The estimated number of students is 190. The student to teacher ratio is less than 18 to 1.

History
Eagle Ridge was founded in 1982 by Dr. Mark Carbaugh. At that time, the school consisted of three classrooms where students grades Kindergarten through eighth grade were taught in a Christian environment.  The school received accreditation in 2000 from ICAA and again in 2001 from North Central.

Activities
ERCS offers numerous extracurricular activities. Students may participate in several different sports, drama club, and Christian Honor Student Association. Each year students participate in Homecoming Dance, spirit week, and Prom.  Students are also encouraged to participate in their local chapter of Big Brothers and Big Sisters of America.

References

See also
Education in the United States

High schools in Cape Girardeau County, Missouri
Private high schools in Missouri
Private middle schools in Missouri
Private elementary schools in Missouri
Christian schools in Missouri
Buildings and structures in Cape Girardeau, Missouri
Educational institutions established in 1982
1982 establishments in Missouri